The women's 3000 metres event at the 1987 Pan American Games was held in Indianapolis, United States on 16 August.

Results

References

Athletics at the 1987 Pan American Games
1987
Pan